Rudolf Fernau (7 January 1898 – 4 November 1985) was a German film actor. He appeared in 53 films between 1936 and 1982. He was born and died in Munich, Germany.

Selected filmography

 The Traitor (1936) - Fritz Brockau
 In the Name of the People (1939) - Alfred Hübner
 The Curtain Falls (1939) - Rodegger
  (1939) - Pedro de Alvarado
 Der Weg zu Isabel (1940) - Vicomte Victor
 Counterfeiters (1940) - Gaston de Frossard, Kopf der Fälscherbande
 Goodbye, Franziska (1941) - Dr. Christoph Leitner
 Kameraden (1941) - Graf Kerski
 Giungla (1942) - Il dottor Jack Bennett
 Vom Schicksal verweht (1942) - Dr. Jack Bennett
 Doctor Crippen (1942) - Dr. Crippen
 Der Verteidiger hat das Wort (1944) - Günther Fabian
 The Roedern Affair (1944) - Graf Wengen
 The Silent Guest (1945) - Oskar Kampmann
 Night of the Twelve (1949) - Rohrbach, Kriminalrat
 The Murder Trial of Doctor Jordan (1949) - Tropenarzt Dr. Jordan
 Friday the Thirteenth (1949) - Robert - Diener
 Maria Theresa (1951) - Graf Kaunitz
 Monks, Girls and Hungarian Soldiers (1952) - Megerle, kurfürstlicher Geheimsekretarius
 The Sergeant's Daughter (1952) - Baron Hügener, Rittergutsbesitzer
 Captain Bay-Bay (1953) - Dr. Mendez
 Königliche Hoheit (1953) - Großherzog Albrecht
 The Witch (1954)
 Hochstaplerin der Liebe (1954) - Adrian van Zanten
 Walking Back into the Past (1954) - Stefan Berg
 Ludwig II (1955) - Prinz Luitpold von Bayern
 Children, Mother, and the General (1955) - Stabsarzt
 Sergeant Borck (1955) - Großhändler Willy Staade
 San Salvatore (1956) - Dr. Stormer, Oberarzt
 Skandal um Dr. Vlimmen (1956)
 The Story of Anastasia (1956) - Russischer Emigrantenführer Serge Botkin
 Confess, Doctor Corda (1958) - Chefarzt Professor Schliessmann
 Im Namen einer Mutter (1961) - Staatsanwalt
 Blind Justice (1961) - Generaldirektor Delgasso
 The Return of Doctor Mabuse (1961) - Pfarrer Briefenstein
 The Strange Countess (1961) - Dr. Tappatt
  (1962) - Professor Erasmus
 The Strangler of Blackmoor Castle (1963) - Lucius Clark
 Der Henker von London (1963) - Jerome
 Piccadilly Zero Hour 12 (1963) - Inspector Jim Craddock
  (1967, TV Movie) - Antonio Piachi
 Dead Body on Broadway (1969) - Nasen-Charly
 Karl May (1974) - Bredereck
 To the Bitter End (1975) - Schauberg
 Everyone Dies Alone (1976) - Kammergerichtsrat Fromm
 Romeo und Julia (1976, TV Movie)
  (1976) - Prior Leonardus
 Die Fastnachtsbeichte (1976, TV Movie) - Henrici
 Derrick (1977–1981, TV Series) - Herr Godell / Alfred Engel
 Seehundskomödie (1978, TV Movie)
 Goldene Zeiten (1981, TV Series) - Vater Bombach
 Qualverwandtschaften (1982, TV Movie)

References

External links

 

1898 births
1985 deaths
German male film actors
Male actors from Munich
Commanders Crosses of the Order of Merit of the Federal Republic of Germany
20th-century German male actors